Timomatic is the second self-titled studio album by Australian recording artist Timomatic. It was released in Australia on 24 August 2012. The album peaked at number 3 in Australia. The album includes the singles "Set It Off", "If Looks Could Kill", "Can You Feel It" and "Incredible".

Singles
 "Set It Off" was released as the lead single from the album on 18 November 2011. The song peaked at number 2 in Australia and number 14 in New Zealand.
 "If Looks Could Kill" was released as the second single from the album on 23 March 2012. The song peaked at number 8 in Australia.
 "Can You Feel It" was released as the third single from the album on 22 June 2012. The song peaked at number 18 in Australia.
 "Incredible" was released as the fourth single from the album on 28 September 2012. The song peaked at number 18 in Australia and number 17 in New Zealand.

Track listing

Chart performance

Release history

References

2012 albums
Timomatic albums